Rollins Band was an American rock band formed in Van Nuys, California. The band was active from 1987 to 2006 and was led by former Black Flag vocalist Henry Rollins. They are best known for the songs "Low Self Opinion" and "Liar", which both earned heavy airplay on MTV in the early-mid 1990s. 

Critic Steve Huey describes their music as "uncompromising, intense, cathartic fusions of funk, post-punk, noise, and jazz experimentalism, with Rollins shouting angry, biting self-examinations and accusations over the grind."

In 2000, Rollins Band was included on VH1's 100 Greatest Artists of Hard Rock, ranking at No. 47.

History

Precursors (1980–1986)
Rollins was the singer for the Washington, D.C. punk rock band State of Alert from October 1980 to July 1981. Afterwards, he sang with California punk rock band Black Flag from August 1981 to August 1986. Black Flag earned little mainstream attention, but through a demanding touring schedule, came to be regarded as one of the most important punk rock bands of the 1980s.

Less than a year after Black Flag broke up, Rollins returned to music with guitarist Chris Haskett (a friend from Rollins' teen years in Washington D.C.), bass guitarist Bernie Wandel, and drummer Mick Green.

This line-up released two records: Hot Animal Machine (credited as a Rollins solo record and featuring cover art drawings by Devo leader Mark Mothersbaugh) and Drive by Shooting (credited to "Henrietta Collins and the Wifebeating Childhaters"). The music was similar to Black Flag's, though it flirted more with heavy metal and funk.

First edition (1987–1994)
Soon after, Rollins formed Rollins Band with Haskett, bassist Andrew Weiss, and drummer Sim Cain (Weiss and Cain had previously played with Gone, an instrumental rock group led by guitarist and Black Flag founder Greg Ginn). Live sound engineer Theo Van Rock was usually credited as a band member.

Critics Ira Robbins and Regina Joskow described this line-up as a "brilliant, strong ensemble ... the band doesn't play punk (more a jazzy, thrashy, swing take on the many moods of Jimi Hendrix), but what they do together has the strengths of both. The group's loud guitar rock with a strong, inventive rhythmic clock borrows only the better attributes of metal, ensuring that noise is never a substitute for purpose."

Second edition (1994–1997)

Rollins's tour diaries from this era details the personal and creative tensions that  led to Weiss being fired following the End of Silence tour. These diaries were published by Rollins's 2.13.61 company as See A Grown Man Cry and Now Watch Him Die.

The band's new bassist was jazz and funk veteran Melvin Gibbs, who'd been highly recommended by Living Colour guitarist Vernon Reid, a friend of the Rollins Band since the first Lollapalooza tour. Cain and Gibbs had also both played in different versions of guitarist Marc Ribot's band. Gibbs performed on Ribot's album Rootless Cosmopolitans (1990) and Cain on Requiem for What's His Name (1992). 

The first video from 1994's Weight, "Liar", was a huge hit on MTV, with Rollins sporting numerous costumes (including a cop and a nun). The band appeared at Woodstock '94, and Rollins was a guest-host for several MTV programs, including 120 Minutes. 

This version of Rollins Band had some of the most overt jazz leanings of the band's history: Gibbs had begun his career with Reid in the 1980s jazz fusion group of drummer Ronald Shannon Jackson, and worked with Sonny Sharrock on albums like 1987's Seize the Rainbow. These influences, along with Rollins' obsession with the late '60s/early '70s electric/fusion era of iconic trumpeter Miles Davis, shaped this version of the band's music. During the sessions for Weight, Rollins Band recorded with free jazz saxophonist Charles Gayle, though these sessions remained unreleased for ten years at Gayle's request to avoid conflicts with his contractual obligations. The Gayle sessions were released in 2003 as Weighting.

In 1996, there was a legal battle with the band's former label, Imago Records. Rollins claimed "fraud, deceit, undue
influence and economic coercion" on the label's part. They signed with the then-new major label DreamWorks Records, who released 1997's Come In and Burn. The album had a minor hit with the single "Starve" and the band appeared on Saturday Night Live to promote the album (season 22, episode 18). However, Come In and Burn was not as successful as Weight and, after touring for Burn, Rollins dissolved the group, citing creative stagnation.

Third edition (1999–2003)
Rollins replaced the Haskett-Gibbs-Cain lineup with the Los Angeles rock band Mother Superior, retaining the name Rollins Band, and released Get Some Go Again (2000) and Nice (2001). They also released a two-disc live album, The Only Way to Know for Sure. This line-up was a more straightforward hard rock group: their first album featured "Are You Ready?" a cover of a Thin Lizzy song, featuring Lizzy guitarist Scott Gorham; Rollins has often expressed fondness for Thin Lizzy and its founder, Phil Lynott.

Fourth edition (2006)
In between other commitments (his radio show Harmony in My Head, his cable/satellite TV show The Henry Rollins Show, and his spoken word tours), Rollins also reunited the Haskett-Gibbs-Cain lineup.
In a blog entry on henryrollins.com, Rollins admitted, "Actually we have been practicing on and off for months now, slowly getting it together ... It's been really cool being back in the practice room with these guys after all these years."

The band opened some concerts for X, and played on the first-season finale of The Henry Rollins Show on August 12, 2006.

Indefinite hiatus (2007–present)
Rollins told Alan Sculley of The Daily Herald that this reunion with Haskett, Gibbs and Cain would not become long-term unless the group decided to write new songs: "Let's put it this way. I don't want to go out and hit America again without a new record, or at least a new album's worth of material. Otherwise the thing will lack legitimacy ... Miles Davis would never do that. And I'm not into a greatest-hits thing. I think a band, if you're going to be around, you should be moving forward and putting in the time and working for it, getting after the art. Otherwise you're just playing retreads. ... Imagine a tree that grows canned peaches. It's nothing I want to do."

Former member Jason Mackenroth died on January 3, 2016, in Nevada from prostate cancer.

Musical style and influences
The band have been categorized under the alternative metal, hard rock, funk metal and post-hardcore genres. Mid-career albums such as Weight also had a pronounced jazz influence. They were part of the early 1990s Los Angeles alternative metal scene, alongside Tool, Jane's Addiction, Rage Against the Machine and Green Jellÿ. Their influences include '70s metal and rock bands, including Black Sabbath, The Velvet Underground, Pink Fairies and Thin Lizzy, as well as progressive rock and jazz fusion bands like King Crimson and Mahavishnu Orchestra. Rollins' shout-singing style proved influential to later alternative and nu metal artists, such as Coal Chamber, Korn, Chevelle, Godsmack and System of a Down. The Rollins Band songs "Tearing" and "Shine" have been covered by Pearl Jam.

Band members
Last line-up
 Henry Rollins – lead vocals (1987–1997, 1999-2003, 2006)
 Chris Haskett – guitar (1987–1997, 2006)
 Sim Cain – drums, percussion (1987–1997, 2006)
 Melvin Gibbs – bass (1993–1997, 2006)

Former members
 Andrew Weiss – bass (1987–1992)
 Jim Wilson – guitar, piano (1999–2003)
 Marcus Blake – bass (1999–2003)
 Jason Mackenroth – drums, percussion, saxophone (1999–2003; died 2016)
 Theo Van Rock – sound engineer

Timeline

Discography

Studio albums

Outtakes and demos collections
A Nicer Shade of Red (2001)
The End of Silence Demos (2002)
Yellow Blues (2003)
Weighting (2004)
Come In and Burn Sessions (2004)
Get Some Go Again Sessions (2005)

Live albums
Live Split Album with Dutch band Gore – recorded at El Mocambo, Toronto, Canada, May 17, 1987
Do It – Studio Outtakes and Live (1988)
Turned On (1990)
Electro Convulsive Therapy (1993)
Insert Band Here: Live in Australia, 1990 (1999)
A Clockwork Orange Stage (2001)
The Only Way to Know for Sure: Live in Chicago (2002)

EPs
Live in Deventer, Holland, October 1987 (1988)
I Know You b/w Earache My Eye (1990)
Hammer of the Rök Gödz (1992)

Singles

Promotional singles
"You Didn't Need" (1992) – radio promo
"Fool" (1994) – 2×12" promo
"Your Number Is One" (2001) – radio promo

Miscellaneous
Rise Above: 24 Black Flag Songs to Benefit the West Memphis Three (2002)

Other appearances

References

External links
Henry Rollins official website

Henry Rollins details the band's history

American alternative metal musical groups
American post-hardcore musical groups
American funk metal musical groups
Hard rock musical groups from California
Heavy metal musical groups from California
Musical groups established in 1986
Musical groups disestablished in 2003
Musical groups reestablished in 2006
Musical groups disestablished in 2006
1987 establishments in California
Buddah Records artists
DreamWorks Records artists
Sanctuary Records artists